Helladia imperialis is a species of longhorn beetle in the subfamily Lamiinae that is endemic to Iran. Adults are on wing from May to July, and it feeds on Centaurea imperialis.

References

Lamiinae
Beetles described in 2001
Endemic fauna of Iran